Luan Krasniqi (born 10 May 1971) is a German actor and former professional boxer. He held the European heavyweight title and also challenged for the WBO world heavyweight title.

Background
Krasniqi is the youngest of eight children to Kosovar Albanian parents. He has often said that he had a happy and active childhood, growing up in Junik, a small town in the District of Deçan, where in 1987 he finished his primary and secondary school, before his family moved to Rottweil in Germany. Krasniqi stated "my childhood was good, but when I learned that we would be rejoining my father who had moved to Rottweil in 1970 I was overjoyed. I had dreamt about a move to the city and now it was coming true!".

Krasniqi graduated in Germany his A-Level and an education as a wholesaler.

Amateur
Krasniqi started boxing at the age of 16. His boxing-career began at the local BSV Rottweil, where he met Theo Kerekesch, a boxing trainer of high regard.

Spotting talent and kinship within each other, hard work developed Krasniqi into a solid, well schooled, heavyweight. Once Krasniqi had been granted German citizenship, he entered the Multi-Nations Tournament in Liverpool, England and won the gold medal. He consolidated the success with a gold medal later that year at the German Championships, Berlin.

Krasniqi stormed the 1995 World Amateur Boxing Championships, by taking the silver medal beating Sinan Samil Sam and Wladimir Klitschko  – losing only to the one of the best amateur boxers of all times, the Cuban great Félix Savón. Krasniqi ended the year on a roll, taking the Heavyweight Gold in the International Chemie Cup Tournament, Halle.

1996 he added the European Championships with a win over Christophe Mendy.

1996 Summer Olympics

At the Olympic Games in Atlanta he beat future amateur and professional champion
Ruslan Chagaev and reached a semi-final bout with Félix Savón.
The semi-final bout against Félix Savón was short-lived. During the bout, Krasniqi was cut under the eye. The cut would be examined by the ringside doctor & result in a medical stoppage. This left him unable to fight for an Olympic Gold Medal. 

Krasniqi returned to Germany with the Bronze medal, Germany's first heavyweight medal since 1976. "I felt that I could have beaten him. He had out-pointed me the previous year but I had grown stronger and developed further since then. I am sure that the fight would have been close but I think that this time, I would have celebrated." However, Krasniqi had many memories to savour from Atlanta - one of which was a meeting with his idol, Muhammad Ali. "Muhammad Ali was and still is an idol. Nobody can ever achieve what he achieved. Such a thing is a once in a lifetime phenomenon."

"To shine so long and so brightly, to define eras in history with the sheer force of his ability and personality and to be so well remembered is unique. Meeting him was an honour I shall never forget." Krasniqi took his first steps to his own fame as he decided to become famous and to get in at Panix Promotions, where Lennox Lewis has his contract.

1996 Olympic Results Boxed as a Heavyweight (– 91 kg)

Round 1 - Defeated Ruslan Chagaev (Uzbekistan) 12:4
Round of 16 - Defeated Igor Kshinin (Russia) 10:2
Quarterfinals - Defeated Serguei Dychkov (Belarus) 10:5
Semifinals - Lost by Félix Savón (Cuba) WO

Professional career
Krasniqi won his first fight (with Harry Senior. In order to improve his training he was invited to train with Lennox Lewis in Big Bear Lake, where he was in preparation for the fight against Andrzej Gołota. Luan showed that he could resist the pressure of sparring with Lewis. Since then, he has been to Big Bear Lake three times.

During Lewis' training for the fights against Shannon Briggs, Željko Mavrović and Evander Holyfield he was one of his sparring partners. Luan overcame with success the first hurdles of his career as a "newcomer" in professional boxing. He boxed extremely successfully for Panix Promotion 15 times and in 2000 after Lennox Lewis had terminated his contract, Luan decided to look for a new alternative. In February and April 2000 he built his connections with Universum Box-Promotion and fought a number of matches for them. In January 2001 he signed a three years long contract with Universum Box-Promotion.

The highlight of his career was the fight against Rene Monse, when he became European Champion. He was the first German European Champion after 29 years.

First loss

A half year later Krasniqi lost his belt in a fight against Przemysław Saleta. The man from Rottweil was prepared for eight rounds. But after an injury of Vitali Klitschko, his fight was pushed to the main event. Mainly due to this lack of preparation, although leading by points, Krasniqi apparently feared a loss and elected to quit.

After this defeat Krasniqi struggled to get back to the top of the European rankings. Finally on 14 February 2004 he won against the "Bull from Bosphorus" Sinan Samil Sam and became European Champion once again.

Later career

2005 brought Krasniqi to the top of the heavyweight competition after he knocked out highly regarded Lance Whitaker and became a mandatory challenger for the WBO crown. He lost against Lamon Brewster. Brewster managed to efficiently attack Krasniqi's body. This resulted in Krasniqi fatiguing in the latter rounds and finally being forced into a punch-exchange and getting knocked down in round 9.

It was a disappointing loss to a lot of German and Albanian fans, since the resurrection of a new German heavyweight champion was highly anticipated to occur on Max Schmeling's 100th birthday.

Luan's next fight took place on 29 April 2006 in Stuttgart, Germany where he won against David Bostice.

Luan Krasniqi was scheduled to fight against Top 10 contender, Tony Thompson, in September 2006, but no contract was made. Krasniqi has stated that the money offered by his promoter Klaus-Peter Kohl was insufficient.

On 17 March 2007, Krasniqi fought Brian Minto for the title of WBO Intercontinental Champion. Despite having a height disadvantage of 4 inches (10 cm), Minto was able to hold his own against Krasniqi. However, in the 12th round Krasniqi was able to knock Minto down and win the match. It was later stated that it was Krasniqi's tactic to tire his adversary. This won Luan Krasniqi the title of Intercontinental Champion and has given him the possibility of a fight against Shannon Briggs.

Kransiqi lost to Tony Thompson, putting a serious dent in his hopes at a future title shot. On 11 November 2008, he lost by a third-round knockout to unbeaten Alexander Dimitrenko.

Personal life
He is currently an actor.
Prior to his boxing success, Krasniqi worked in wholesale and foreign trade. Luan Krasniqi's two boxing idols are Muhammad Ali and Lennox Lewis.

Accomplishments
German Heavyweight Champion 2001-2002
EBU Heavyweight Champion 2002, 2004–2005
WBO Intercontinental Champion 2007.

Professional boxing record

|-
| style="text-align:center;" colspan="8"|30 Wins (14 knockouts, 16 decisions), 4 Losses (4 knockouts, 0 decisions), 1 Draw
|-  style="text-align:center; background:#e3e3e3;"
|  style="border-style:none none solid solid; "|Result
|  style="border-style:none none solid solid; "|Record
|  style="border-style:none none solid solid; "|Opponent
|  style="border-style:none none solid solid; "|Type
|  style="border-style:none none solid solid; "|Round
|  style="border-style:none none solid solid; "|Date
|  style="border-style:none none solid solid; "|Location
|  style="border-style:none none solid solid; "|Notes
|- align=center
|Loss
|
|align=left| Alexander Dimitrenko
|KO
|3
|15/11/2008
|align=left| Düsseldorf, Germany
|align=left|
|-
|Loss
|
|align=left| Tony Thompson
|TKO
|5
|14/07/2007
|align=left| Hamburg, Germany
|align=left|
|-
|Win
|
|align=left| Brian Minto
|UD
|12
|17/03/2007
|align=left| Stuttgart, Germany
|align=left|
|-
|Win
|
|align=left| David Bostice
|UD
|10
|29/04/2006
|align=left| Stuttgart, Germany
|align=left|
|-
|Loss
|
|align=left| Lamon Brewster
|TKO
|9
|28/09/2005
|align=left| Hamburg, Germany
|align=left|
|-
|Win
|
|align=left| Lance Whitaker
|KO
|6
|28/05/2005
|align=left| Stuttgart, Germany
|align=left|
|-
|Draw
|
|align=left| Timo Hoffmann
|PTS
|12
|04/12/2004
|align=left| Berlin, Germany
|align=left|
|-
|Win
|
|align=left| Rene Monse
|TKO
|7
|31/07/2004
|align=left| Stuttgart, Germany
|align=left|
|-
|Win
|
|align=left| Sinan Şamil Sam
|UD
|12
|14/02/2004
|align=left| Stuttgart, Germany
|align=left|
|-
|Win
|
|align=left| Julius Francis
|UD
|8
|18/10/2003
|align=left| Hamburg, Germany
|align=left|
|-
|Win
|
|align=left| Doug Liggion
|UD
|8
|30/08/2003
|align=left| Munich, Germany
|align=left|
|-
|Win
|
|align=left| Przemysław Saleta
|TKO
|1
|26/04/2003
|align=left| Schwerin, Germany
|align=left|
|-
|Win
|
|align=left| Sedreck Fields
|UD
|8
|08/02/2003
|align=left| Berlin, Germany
|align=left|
|-
|Win
|
|align=left| Thomas Williams
|KO
|1
|23/11/2002
|align=left| Dortmund, Germany
|align=left|
|-
|Loss
|
|align=left| Przemysław Saleta
|TKO
|9
|20/07/2002
|align=left| Dortmund, Germany
|align=left|
|-
|Win
|
|align=left| Rene Monse
|MD
|12
|05/01/2002
|align=left| Magdeburg, Germany
|align=left|
|-
|Win
|
|align=left| Yuriy Yelistratov
|TKO
|3
|29/09/2001
|align=left| Hamburg, Germany
|align=left|
|-
|Win
|
|align=left| Rene Hanl
|TKO
|2
|21/07/2001
|align=left| Aachen, Germany
|align=left|
|-
|Win
|
|align=left| Paul Phillips
|KO
|1
|07/04/2001
|align=left| Hamburg, Germany
|align=left|
|-
|Win
|
|align=left| Cleveland Woods
|KO
|3
|24/02/2001
|align=left| Hamburg, Germany
|align=left|
|-
|Win
|
|align=left| Rodney McSwain
|TKO
|4
|27/05/2000
|align=left| London, England
|align=left|
|-
|Win
|
|align=left| Antoine Palatis
|PTS
|6
|01/04/2000
|align=left| Berlin, Germany
|align=left|
|-
|Win
|
|align=left| Everett Martin
|PTS
|8
|19/02/2000
|align=left| Berlin, Germany
|align=left|
|-
|Win
|
|align=left| Michael Murray
|PTS
|8
|18/12/1999
|align=left| London, England
|align=left|
|-
|Win
|
|align=left| Alexey Osokin
|TKO
|3
|16/10/1999
|align=left| Belfast, Northern Ireland
|align=left|
|-
|Win
|
|align=left| Biko Botowamungu
|DQ
|5
|21/08/1999
|align=left| Dresden, Germany
|align=left|
|-
|Win
|
|align=left| Ladislav Husarik
|PTS
|6
|27/03/1999
|align=left| Dresden, Germany
|align=left|
|-
|Win
|
|align=left| Shane Woollas
|TKO
|3
|26/09/1998
|align=left| York, England
|align=left|
|-
|Win
|
|align=left| Abdelrani Berbachi
|PTS
|6
|02/05/1998
|align=left| London, England
|align=left|
|-
|Win
|
|align=left| Spas Spasov
|PTS
|6
|28/03/1998
|align=left| Kingston upon Hull, England
|align=left|
|-
|Win
|
|align=left| Stefan Trendafilov
|TKO
|1
|14/02/1998
|align=left| London, England
|align=left|
|-
|Win
|
|align=left| Phillipe Houyvet
|TKO
|4
|16/12/1997
|align=left| Nord, France
|align=left|
|-
|Win
|
|align=left| Lewan Livingstone
|UD
|4
|02/11/1997
|align=left| Halle, Germany
|align=left|
|-
|Win
|
|align=left| Kevin Hudson
|TKO
|4
|04/10/1997
|align=left| Atlantic City, New Jersey, U.S.
|align=left|
|-
|Win
|
|align=left| Harry Senior
|PTS
|4
|02/09/1997
|align=left| London, England
|align=left|
|}

Television viewership

Germany

Notes

References

External links
 

1971 births
Living people
People from the District of Gjakova
Olympic boxers of Germany
Heavyweight boxers
Boxers at the 1996 Summer Olympics
Yugoslav emigrants to Germany
Kosovan emigrants to Germany
German people of Albanian descent
German people of Kosovan descent
European Boxing Union champions
German male boxers
AIBA World Boxing Championships medalists
Medalists at the 1996 Summer Olympics
Olympic bronze medalists for Germany
Albanian male boxers